Coquihalla River Provincial Park is a provincial park in British Columbia, Canada, located  north of the town of Hope on BC Highway 5 adjacent to the Coquihalla River.

The park was established as the Coquihalla River Recreation Area in 1986, comprising
It was upgraded in full provincial park status in 1999 but not fully upgraded by statute until 2000.

References

Provincial parks of British Columbia
Lower Mainland
Canadian Cascades
1986 establishments in British Columbia
Protected areas established in 1986